Murder, He Says is a 1945 American black comedy film directed by George Marshall and starring Fred MacMurray about a murderous rural family and the hapless pollster who becomes entangled in their hunt for a cache of money.

It was filmed in the spring of 1944, but was held back for a year because Paramount had a backlog of product and felt it was more important to get war-related films released first, lest they suddenly become dated by the impending end of combat.

Plot
Peter Marshall (Fred MacMurray), who works for the Trotter Poll ("like the Gallup Poll, but not as fast"), is sent out to find a missing co-worker, Hector Smedley. He goes to see the last family the man was supposed to interview, the nutty and murderous Fleagles. There he runs afoul of Mert and Bert Fleagle (both played by Peter Whitney), the gun-toting twin sons of Mamie Fleagle Smithers Johnson (Marjorie Main).

As matriarch of the clan Mamie insists that Peter, to escape death at the hands of Mert or Bert, pretend to be the boyfriend of jailed Bonnie Fleagle in order to gain the confidence of her dying grandmother (Mabel Paige). Grandma Fleagle has hidden $70,000 stolen by Bonnie and her now-executed father, but refuses to divulge where to her unwanted relations for a very good reason: she tells Pete that she has been poisoned by them. Before she dies, she teaches Pete a nonsensical song which is also known to Elany Fleagle (Jean Heather), Mamie's dimwitted daughter.

The Fleagles are sure Grandma told Pete where the money is hidden and keep him captive. Then, a woman claiming to be Bonnie shows up, also looking for the loot. When she gets Pete alone for questioning, she reveals she is actually Claire Matthews (Helen Walker). Her innocent father was maliciously implicated by Bonnie's father in the bank robbery. Pete wants to escape, now that they are alone, but Claire insists on staying. If she can retrieve the money, she can exonerate her father.

The Fleagles try to poison Claire at dinner, but Pete accidentally discovers that all but one of their plates have been poisoned (the poison glows in the dark); only the dish in front of Mamie's third husband, Mr. Johnson (Porter Hall), is safe to eat. Johnson slips away, but is soon found glowing and dead.

The uneasy situation is further complicated when the real Bonnie Fleagle (Barbara Pepper) breaks out of prison and comes for her money. She makes Pete sing the song and she understands the seemingly meaningless lyrics. Pete gets away, and he deciphers the clues hidden in the words, from which Claire finds a key to the safety deposit box. Soon, all of the Fleagles, including Mr. Johnson (who had faked his death), are chasing Pete and Claire through the various secret passageways of the house. The plucky pair are able to drop each of their pursuers into a hay baling machine, from which they emerge safely.

Cast
 Fred MacMurray as Pete Marshall
 Helen Walker as Claire Matthews
 Marjorie Main as Mamie Fleagle Smithers Johnson
 Jean Heather as Elany Fleagle
 Porter Hall as Mr. Johnson
 Peter Whitney as Mert Fleagle / Bert Fleagle
 Mabel Paige as Grandma Fleagle
 Barbara Pepper as Bonnie Fleagle

External links

1945 films
1940s crime comedy films
American crime comedy films
American black-and-white films
Films directed by George Marshall
Films scored by Robert Emmett Dolan
1945 comedy films
Paramount Pictures films
1940s English-language films
1940s American films